Whittingham is a village and civil parish in Northumberland, England.
The thirteenth/fourteenth century pele tower, Whittingham Tower, was converted into almshouses in 1845 and is now in private ownership.

History  
The village name is thought to derive from Anglo-Saxon times, meaning 'the meeting place of Hwita's people'.
The double ford at the west of the village has led some historians to suggest this is the location of 'Twyford' mentioned in the writings of the Venerable Bede.

There were two pele towers in the village. One to the west of the village near the church and used by the clergy. It was listed in a survey in 1541. It was either incorporated into the vicarage or dismantled when the current vicarage was built.

The second pele tower was destroyed during the rebellion of Gilbert de Middleton in 1371. By 1415 it had been replaced and was owned by WillIam Heron. In 1541 it was owned by Robert Collingwood. The tower was restored and modernised in 1845 to serve as an almshouse for the poor of the Ravensworth's estate.

Governance 
Whittingham is in the parliamentary constituency of Berwick-upon-Tweed.

Geography 

The village sits in the valley of the River Aln; characterised by gentle rolling hills and fertile soils this area is frequently referred to as the Vale of Whittingham. There are road bridges over the river at either end of the village and a footbridge in the centre. At the western end of the village the River Aln meets Callaly Burn and there is a double ford at the confluence with two footbridges alongside.

Economy 
The village no longer has shops or a pub. The nearest shops are in Glanton (a post office) and at Powburn. There is a pub in Glanton.

Landmarks 

Two Roman roads passed close to the village – to the east is the Devil's Causeway and south of the village is the road from High Rochester. These met at Learchild fort about 2 km east of the village.

Education 
The village has a primary school - Whittingham Church of England First School - with around 100 pupils (6 January 2019).

Religious sites 
The parish church is dedicated to St Bartholomew, shown in a stained-glass window. There is Anglo-Saxon stonework in the tower that dates from around 900 AD, but a church was recorded here in 735. The tower arch is plain and massive; the medieval work has been subject to much later alteration. The 19th-century redecoration includes plain lead-glazing in the windows.

There are several gravestones in the churchyard that have skulls incised on them, these are known as Memento Mori stones and are listed monuments.

Halfway between the village and Glanton, situated in a small copse, is St. Mary's Roman Catholic church. The church was built 1877-1881 when the chapel at Callaly Castle was deconsecrated after the Catholic Clavering family sold the castle. The church is built in the Romanesque style. There is also an attached presbytery.

Gallery

References

External links

Villages in Northumberland